London Ink is a British reality television show on Discovery Real Time that follows the tattoo artists Louis Molloy, Nikole Lowe, Dan Gold, and Phil Kyle.

Premise
Each of the artists brings a different style to London Ink. Louis Molloy, is an expert in parallel and straight lines and other difficult shapes, and has tattooed David Beckham. Dan Gold is an avid graffiti artist in the freehand new wave graffiti style. New Zealand artist Nikole Lowe specializes in Japanese, Tibetan, and Indian-themed art. American Phil Kyle brings a new wave old school style with his own twist over to England. The show is a spin-off of Miami Ink and premiered on 23 September 2007.

The first series was filmed at London Tattoo in Islington, London. The shop lives on as a day to day tattoo studio London Tattoo at the Islington location.

Cast
Main members
 Louis Molloy
 Nikole Lowe
 Dan Gold
 Phil Kyle

Celebrity customers
 Iwan Thomas
 Darren Thompson
 Shane Lynch
 Alex Kramer
 Emily Scott

Episodes
 Season 1 - 6 episodes
 Season 2 - 6 episodes

See also
 List of tattoo TV shows

References

External links
 
 London Ink at Discovery Real Time

Discovery Channel original programming
2007 British television series debuts
British reality television series
Television series set in tattoo shops
English-language television shows